The 52nd Dan Kolov & Nikola Petrov Tournament,  was a sport wrestling event held in  Sofia, Bulgaria between 21 and 23 February 2014.

This international tournament includes competition in both men's and women's freestyle wrestling and men's Greco-Roman wrestling. This tournament is held in honor of Dan Kolov who was the first European freestyle wrestling champion from Bulgaria and  European and World Champion Nikola Petroff.

Medal table

Team ranking

Medal overview

Men's freestyle

Greco-Roman

Women's freestyle

Participating nations

351 competitors from 35 nations participated.
 (13)
 (17)
 (8)
 (7)
 (2)
 (64)
 (6)
 (2)
 (3)
 (5)
 (3)
 (2)
 (1)
 (20)
 (8)
 (9)
 (1)
 (1)
 (3)
 (2)
 (1)
 (5)
 (10)
 (15)
 (25)
 (23)
 (1)
 (6)
 (2)
 (4)
 (4)
 (6)
 (36)
 (30)
 (6)

References 

2014 in European sport
2014 in sport wrestling
February 2014 sports events in Europe
2014 in Bulgarian sport